The freak scene was originally a component of the bohemian subculture which began in California in the mid-1960s, associated with (or part of) the hippie movement.  The term is also used to refer to the post-hippie and pre-punk period of the early to mid-1970s. It can be viewed as encompassing a range of disparate groups including hippies, pacifists, politicized radicals, as well as psychedelic and progressive rock fans. Those connected with the subculture often attended rock festivals, free festivals, happenings, and alternative society gatherings of various kinds.

Origins
In the United States of the 1960s, especially during the heyday of the hippie counterculture on the west coast, many teens and young adults that were disillusioned with the austere confines of the postwar, suburbanite American way of life, and some of the resultant countercultural and New Left movements defined themselves as "freaks".  During the early 1960s, painter, sculptor and former marathon dancing champion Vito Paulekas and his wife Szou established a clothing boutique on the corner of Laurel Avenue and Beverly Boulevard in Hollywood, close to Laurel Canyon.  Paulekas and his later associate Carl Franzoni (known as "Captain Fuck") were known for their sexual appetites and unconventional behavior. They and an expanding troupe of associates called themselves "freaks" or "freakers", and became well known in the area by about 1963 for their eccentric free form dancing in Sunset Strip nightclubs, being described as "an acid-drenched extended family of brain-damaged cohabitants".

Barry Miles wrote: "The first hippies in Hollywood, perhaps the first hippies anywhere, were Vito, his wife Zsou , Captain Fuck and their group of about thirty-five dancers. Calling themselves Freaks, they lived a semi-communal life and engaged in sex orgies and free-form dancing whenever they could." Frank Zappa said of Vito's freaks:  "As soon as they arrived they would make things happen, because they were dancing in a way nobody had seen before, screaming and yelling out on the floor and doing all kinds of weird things. They were dressed in a way that nobody could believe, and they gave life to everything that was going on."

Musicians and others who became associated with the scene at the time included Zappa, his later wife Gail Sloatman, Kim Fowley, Arthur Lee, David Crosby, Don Van Vliet (Captain Beefheart), and The GTOs.   Zappa and The Mothers of Invention became central to the freak scene in Los Angeles, and the term freak appeared throughout the liner notes of the 1966 Mothers of Invention album, Freak Out!.  At the first Mothers of Invention concerts, audience members were invited to "freak out!", which meant to express themselves freely, be it through dancing, screaming, or letting a band member spray them with whipped cream. In terms of concert culture, the freak mentality influenced similar bands of subsequent musical generations. The freaks, by Zappa's reckoning, resisted the binaries of right versus left, dominant culture versus counterculture, or squares versus hippies, preferring instead to align themselves with an aesthetic not narrowly defined by fashion or political leanings. The concept also allowed The Mothers to celebrate the freak identity, which until then was used to describe perversions of nature or carnivalesque sideshows. 'Bearded and gross and filthy, entirely obscene, they...were freaks. They were meant to be. They were playing the same old game again, épater la bourgeoisie, but this time round it wasn't called Dada or Existentialism or Beat, it was Freak-Out'.  "On a personal level", wrote Zappa, "Freaking out is a process whereby an individual casts off outmoded and restricted standards of thinking, dress and social etiquette in order to express CREATIVELY his relationship to his environment and the social structure as a whole"'.

Wider use of the term
The term "freaks" became much more widely and generally used in the late 1960s and early 1970s, often as a synonym for "hippies" (although Zappa, in particular, regularly drew a clear distinction between the two subcultures). The freaks, with their aggressively anti-social stance, came in for much criticism, not only from conventional culture but from within the counterculture itself, for their 'pretext of a theoretically total but actually quite false revolt against the "conventional lies of civilization"'. John Lennon sang how '"freaks on the phone won't leave me alone"', explaining how he was 'sick of all these aggressive hippies or whatever they are, the Now Generation...demanding my attention as if I owed them something...under a delusion of awareness by having long hair and that's what I'm sick of'. Bob Dylan also suffered from 'Dylan freaks...once more trying to force him to live up to their concept of what he should be'. In a not atypical exchange, he'd be told '"you've got to live up to your responsibility as a culture hero – you're DYLAN, man, every freak has a soft spot in their heart for ya...you're DYLAN, DYLAN, DYLAN."' only for him to reply '"I'm not Dylan, you're Dylan"'.

Members of the Weather Underground drafted their manifesto and declaration of war on the U.S. state with the sentence: "Freaks are revolutionaries and revolutionaries are freaks".

Freaks' hairstyles were mostly long and unkempt. The clothing of the freaks used elements of roleplay such as headbands, cloaks, frock coats, and kaftans, suggesting either a romantic historical era or a distant region. These were combined with cheap, hardwearing clothes such as jeans and army surplus coats.

Music and culture

Freak scene music was an eclectic mixture based around progressive rock and experimentalism. There were crossover bands bridging rock and jazz, rock and folk, rock and sci-fi (space rock). BBC radio presenter John Peel presented a nightly show that featured the music.  In 1967, The Bonzo Dog Doo-Dah Band's album parodied the expression in the sleeve notes for the song "Cool Britannia", which said "Someone letta Freak-Out? What do you think Reader?" Another musical reference is in Joni Mitchell's 1971 song Carey:  "A round for these freaks and these soldiers / A round for these friends of mine..." Ian Gillan of Deep Purple often referred to himself as a freak, such as in the song "Space Truckin'" (with the lyric "The Freaks said 'Man those cats could really swing'") and the song "No No No" (with the line "Looking at them all it feels good to be a freak").

J. R. R. Tolkien novels were big influences on lyrics of bands like Led Zeppelin, which created interest in the novels among followers of the bands.

The freak scene made inroads into the underground comix movement in The Fabulous Furry Freak Brothers by Gilbert Shelton in 1968. Fabulous Furry Freak Brothers comics, an original underground comix scene, over three decades had influenced thousands of people and thousands of new readers yearly.

Following the success of the 1978 smash hit "Le Freak" by Chic, the term enjoyed somewhat of a resurgence on the funk scene by the early 1980s, thanks to artists like Rick James, Whodini and Midnight Star. In 1981, Was (Not Was) released "Out Come the Freaks". The 1988 album Bug by Dinosaur Jr includes the song "Freak Scene". The song "Freak" by Silverchair in 1997 explains the feeling of being alienated. Lana Del Rey references the freak scene in her song "Freak."

Notable freak scene musicians

California
 Alice Cooper
 Captain Beefheart
 The Electric Flag
 The GTOs
 The Oxford Circle
 Sons of Champlin
 Wild Man Fischer
 The West Coast Pop Art Experimental Band
 Ya Ho Wha 13
 Frank Zappa

Michigan
 The Aardvarks
 MC5
 Iggy Pop
 SRC
 The Up

New York
 Attila
 David Peel
 The Fugs
 The Holy Modal Rounders

Texas
 The 13th Floor Elevators
 Bloodrock

Pennsylvania
 The Deep

Britain
 Gong
 Hawkwind
 Pink Fairies
 Quintessence
 The Deviants
 The Edgar Broughton Band
 Third Ear Band

See also
Counterculture
Counterculture of the 1960s
Protopunk
New Age travellers
UK Underground
Yippies

References

Further reading

External links
 Freaks and Monsters
 The Freak Zone programme on BBC 6Music
 Internet Archive Audio files featuring the descriptive term "freakout"
 Philm Freax Digital Archive
 More Phreak scene links
 Facsimile and excerpt from  We are the people our parents warned us against by Nicholas Von Hoffman (historically interesting particularly for its demonstration of homophobia within a hippy social context preceding the freak scene's more enlightened attitude) 
 An excerpt from Richard Neville's book Playpower  on the author's website -  Neville was one of the founders of Oz magazine.

 
Hippie movement
History of subcultures
Musical subcultures
Underground culture